Barter is a surname. Notable people with the surname include:

Augusta Barter (1909–1999), Canadian nurse
Charles St Leger Barter (1857–1931), British soldier
Frederick Barter (1891–1952), Welsh soldier
John Barter (1917–1983), British politician
Krystal Barter, breast cancer survivor
Marion Barter (born 1945), Australian missing teacher who has not been seen since 1997
Peter Barter (born 1940), Papua New Guinean politician
Richard Barter (physician) (1802–1870), Irish physician
Richard H. Barter (1833–1859), Canadian fugitive and murder victim